Jonathan Bolanos (born 20 May 1998) is an American soccer player who plays as a midfielder for Huntsville City FC in MLS Next Pro.

Career

High Point University
From 2016 to 2019, Bolanos played for NCAA Division I side High Point University, where he was twice named to the All-Big South First Team. Over three seasons, Bolanos appeared in 54 matches, logging 32 starts. He posted thirteen goals, four of which were game winners, and seven assists in his time playing for the Panthers.

Richmond Kickers
In January 2020, Bolanos signed with the Richmond Kickers of USL League One. He made his league debut for the club on 25 July 2020, coming on as a 63rd-minute substitute for Mutaya Mwape in a 3–2 away defeat to the Greenville Triumph.
During the 2020 season, Bolanos scored his first two professional goals in a 2–1 win over Orlando City B in Week 13 of USL League One. That week, he was named to the USL League One Team of the Week.

In the 2021 USL League One season, Bolanos appeared in 28 matches, starting 24 of them at various attacking positions. He posted five goals and one assist. In August 2021, Bolanos scored the game-winning goal in the 46th minute against Greenville Triumph FC.

On June 13, 2022, Bolanos was named USL League One Player of the Week for Week 11 of the 2022 season after notching three assists against the Charlotte Independence. He finished the regular season with six goals and 11 assists, the latter of which was a USL League One single-season record. He also received an All-League First Team selection and a nomination for league MVP, finishing second behind teammate Emiliano Terzaghi.

Honors

Individual
USL League One MVP Nominee: 2022
USL League One All-League First Team: 2022

References

External links
Jonathan Bolanos at High Point University Athletics

1998 births
Living people
American soccer players
Association football midfielders
Des Moines Menace players
High Point Panthers men's soccer players
People from Miramar, Florida
Richmond Kickers players
Soccer players from Florida
Sportspeople from Broward County, Florida
MLS Next Pro players
USL League One players
USL League Two players